Șișești is a commune located in Mehedinți County, Oltenia, Romania. It is composed of six villages: Cărămidaru, Ciovârnășani, Cocorova, Crăguești, Noapteșa, and Șișești.

Natives
 
 Gheorghe Ionescu-Sisești

References

Communes in Mehedinți County
Localities in Oltenia